The 37th Division was a military formation belonging to the Spanish Republican Army that fought during the Spanish Civil War. It was deployed on the Extremadura front during the entire war.

History 
The unit was created in May 1937, in the Front of Extremadura. The division, which was made up of the mixed brigades 20th, 63rd, 91st and 109th, was assigned to VII Army Corps. It had its headquarters in Castuera. During the following months, it remained in its positions, without intervening in relevant operations.

In July 1938, it took part in the Battle of Merida pocket, during which he suffered considerable damage. Its 20th and 91st brigades were isolated inside the pocket, suffering heavy losses, although some troops managed to escape the siege. For its part, the 109th Mixed Brigade was completely destroyed, although it was rebuilt later. The division was subjected to a reorganization, with the militia major José Sabín Pérez taking command. 

It did not take part in major military operations again.

Command 
 Commanders
 Lieutenant Colonel Juan Arce Mayora
 Lieutenant Colonel José Ruiz Farrona
 Infantry captain Justo López Mejías
 Infantry commander Alejandro Sánchez Cabezudo
 Infantry commander Antonio Cano Chacón
 Militia major José Sabín Pérez;
 Militia major Donato Sánchez Lueño;
 Militia major Olegario Pachón Núñez;

 Commissars
 Benigno Cardeñoso Negrete, of the PSOE;
 Miguel Carnicero, from the PSOE;
 Germán Clemente de la Cruz, from the CNT;

 Chiefs of Staff
 Commander Donato Sánchez Muñoz;
 Captain Pedro Tirado Navarro;
 Commander Manuel Luque Molinello;

Order of battle

References

Bibliography 
 
 
 
 
 

Military units and formations established in 1937
Military units and formations disestablished in 1939
Divisions of Spain
Military units and formations of the Spanish Civil War
Military history of Spain
Armed Forces of the Second Spanish Republic